The Korean alphabet (Hangul) is the native script of Korea, created in the mid fifteenth century by King Sejong, as both a complement and an alternative to the logographic Sino-Korean Hanja. Initially denounced by the educated class as eonmun (vernacular writing;), it only became the primary Korean script following independence from Japan in the mid-20th century.

The Korean alphabet is a featural alphabet written in morpho-syllabic blocks, and was designed for both the Korean and Chinese languages, though the letters specific to Chinese are now obsolete. Each block consists of at least one consonant letter and one vowel letter. When promulgated, the blocks reflected the morphology of Korean, but for most of the fifteenth century they were organized into syllables. In the twentieth century the morpho-syllabic tradition was revived. The blocks were traditionally written in vertical columns from top to bottom, although they are now commonly written in horizontal rows from left to right as well.

Spacing has been introduced to separate words, and punctuation to indicate clauses and sentences, so that the Korean alphabet now transcribes Korean at the levels of feature, segment, syllable, morpheme, word, clause, and sentence. However, the suprasegmental features of tone and vowel length, seen as single and double tick marks to the left of the syllabic blocks in the image in the next section, have been dropped.

In 1948 North Korea introduced six new letters, including two of Sejong's which had become obsolete in order to make the Korean alphabet a perfect morphophonological fit to the Korean language. However they were soon discarded.

Historical record

Sejong the Great, the fourth king of the Joseon dynasty, personally created Hangul and revealed it in 1443. Afterward, King Sejong wrote the preface to the Hunminjeongeum (the original treatise on Hangul), explaining the origin and purpose of Hangul and providing brief examples and explanations, and then tasked the Hall of Worthies to write detailed examples and explanations. The head of the Hall of Worthies, Jeong In-ji, was responsible for compiling the Hunminjeongeum. The Hunminjeongeum was published and promulgated to the public in 1446.

In the Hunminjeongeum ("The Proper Sounds for the Education of the People"), after which the alphabet itself was named, Sejong explained that he created the new script because the existing idu system, based on Chinese characters, was not a good fit for the Korean language and were so difficult that only privileged male aristocrats (yangban) could afford the time and education to learn to read and write fluently. The vast majority of Koreans were left effectively illiterate. The Korean alphabet, on the other hand, was designed so that even a commoner with little education could learn to read and write: "A wise man can acquaint himself with them before the morning is over; a stupid man can learn them in the space of ten days."

Except for the obsolete palatal stops, all 36 initials in the Chinese inventory had Korean equivalents:

During the second half of the fifteenth century, the new Korean script was used primarily by women and the under-educated. It faced heavy opposition from Confucian scholars educated in Chinese, notably Choe Manri, who believed hanja to be the only legitimate writing system. Later kings also opposed it. In 1504, some commoners wrote posters in Hangul mocking King Yeonsangun, so he forbade use of Hangul and initiated a series of palace purges. In 1506, King Jungjong abolished the Hangul Ministry. The account of the design of the Korean alphabet was lost, and it would not return to common use until after World War II.

Consonant letters as outlines of speech organs

Various fanciful speculations about the creation of hangul were put to rest by the 1940 discovery of the 1446 Hunmin jeong-eum haerye "Explanation of the Hunmin Jeong-eum with Examples". This document explains the design of the consonant letters according to articulatory phonetics and the vowel letters according to Confucian principles such as the yin and yang of vowel harmony (see below).

Following the Indic tradition, consonants in the Korean alphabet are classified according to the speech organs involved in their production. However, the Korean alphabet goes a step further, in that the shapes of the letters iconically represent the speech organs, so that all consonants of the same articulation are based on the same shape. As such, the Korean alphabet has been classified as a featural alphabet by Geoffrey Sampson, though other scholars such as John DeFrancis are believed to have disagreed with this classification.

For example, the shape of the velar consonant (牙音 "molar sound") ㄱ  is said to represent the back of the tongue bunched up to block the back of the mouth near the molars. Aspirate ㅋ  is derived from this by the addition of a stroke which represents aspiration. The Chinese voiced/"muddy" ㄲ  is created by doubling ㄱ. The doubled letters were only used for Chinese, as Korean had not yet developed its series of emphatic consonants. In the twentieth century they were revived for the Korean emphatics.

Similarly, the coronal consonants (舌音 "tongue sounds") are said to show the (front of the) tongue bent up to touch the palate, the bilabial consonants (脣音 "lip sounds") represent the lips touching or parting, the sibilants (齒音 "incisor sounds") represent the teeth (in sibilants the airstream is directed against the teeth), and the guttural consonants (喉音 "throat sounds"), including the null initial used when a syllable begins with a vowel, represent an open mouth and throat.

The labiodental consonants (輕脣音 "light lip sounds") are derived from the bilabial series. In all cases but the labials, the plain (清 "clear") stops have a vertical top stroke, the non-stops lack that stroke, and the aspirate stops have an additional stroke. There were a few additional irregular consonants, such as the coronal lateral/flap ㄹ , which the Haerye only explains as an altered outline of the tongue, and the velar nasal ㆁ . The irregularity of the labials has no explanation in the Haerye, but may be a remnant of the graphic origin of the basic letter shapes in the imperial Phags-pa alphabet of Yuan Dynasty China.

Phags-pa theory

The choub alphabet or square Tibetan (phagspa) could offer some distant analogy for some of the consonants of the Korean alphabet. The linguist Gari Ledyard studied potential links between Phags-pa and Hangul, however, and believed that the influence of Phags-pa, if any, was very limited:

Although the Hunmin jeong-eum haerye (hereafter Haerye) explains the design of the consonantal letters in terms of articulatory phonetics, it also states that Sejong adapted them from the enigmatic 古篆字  "Gǔ Seal Script". The identity of this script has long been puzzling. The primary meaning of the character 古 gǔ is "old", so 古篆字 gǔ zhuānzì has traditionally been interpreted as "Old Seal Script", frustrating philologists, because the Korean alphabet bears no functional similarity to Chinese 篆字 zhuānzì seal scripts.

However the character 古 gǔ also functions as a phonetic component of 蒙古 Měnggǔ "Mongol". Indeed, records from Sejong's day played with this ambiguity, joking that "no one is older (more 古 gǔ) than the 蒙古 Měng-gǔ". From palace records that 古篆字 gǔ zhuānzì was a veiled reference to the 蒙古篆字 měnggǔ zhuānzì "Mongol Seal Script", that is, a formal variant of the Mongol Phags-pa alphabet of the Yuan dynasty (1271-1368) that had been modified to look like the Chinese seal script, and which had been an official script of the empire.

There were Phags-pa manuscripts in the Korean palace library from the Yuan Dynasty government, including some in the seal-script form, and several of Sejong's ministers knew the script well. If this was the case, Sejong's evasion on the Mongol connection can be understood in light of the political situation in the Ming Dynasty. The topic of the recent Mongol domination of China, which had ended just 75 years earlier, was politically sensitive, and both the Chinese and Korean literati regarded the Mongols as barbarians with nothing to contribute to a civilized society.

It is postulated that the Koreans adopted five core consonant letters from Phags-pa, namely ㄱ g , ㄷ d , ㅂ b , ㅈ j , and ㄹ l . These were the consonants basic to Chinese phonology, rather than the graphically simplest letters (ㄱ g , ㄴ n , ㅁ m , and ㅅ s ) taken as the starting point by the Haerye. A sixth letter, the null initial ㅇ, was invented by Sejong. The rest of the consonants were developed through featural derivation from these six, essentially as described in the Haerye; a resemblance to speech organs was an additional motivating factor in selecting the shapes of both the basic letters and their derivatives.

Although several of the basic concepts of the Korean alphabet may have been inherited from Indic phonology through the Phags-pa script, such as the relationships among the homorganic consonants, Chinese phonology played a major role. Besides the grouping of letters into syllables, in functional imitation of Chinese characters, Ledyard argues that it was Chinese phonology, not Indic, that determined which five consonants were basic, and were therefore to be retained from Phags-pa. These included the plain stop letters, ꡂ g  for ㄱ g , ꡊ d  for ㄷ d , and ꡎ b  for ㅂ b , which were basic to Chinese theory, but which represented voiced consonants in the Indic languages and were not basic in the Indic tradition. The other two letters were the plain sibilant ꡛ s  for ㅈ j  (ㅈ was pronounced  in the fifteenth century, as it still is in North Korea) and the liquid ꡙ l  for ㄹ l .

The five adopted letters were graphically simplified, retaining the outline of the Phags-pa letters but with a reduced number of strokes that recalled the shapes of the speech organs involved, as explained in the Haerye. For example, the box inside Phags-pa ꡂ g  is not found in the Korean ㄱ g ; only the outer stroke remains. In addition to being iconic for the shape of the "root" of the tongue, this more easily allowed for consonant clusters and left room for an added stroke to derive the aspirated consonant ㅋ k . But in contrast to the Haerye account, the non-stops  ng , ㄴ n , ㅁ m , and ㅅ s  were derived by removing the top stroke or strokes of the basic letters. (No letter was derived from ㄹ l .) This clears up a few points that had been problematic in the Haerye. For example, while it is straightforward to derive ㅁ m from ㅂ b by removing the top of ㅂ b in Ledyard's account, it is not clear how one would derive ㅂ b by adding something to ㅁ m, since ㅂ b is not analogous to the other stops: If ㅂ b were derived as in the Haerye account, it would be expected to have a horizontal top stroke similar to those of ㄱ g , ㄷ d , and ㅈ j .

In order to maintain the Chinese convention of initial and rime, Sejong and his ministers needed a null symbol to refer to the lack of a consonant with an initial vowel. He chose the circle ㅇ with the subsequent derivation of the glottal stop ㆆ  , by adding a vertical top stroke by analogy with the other stops, and the aspirate ㅎ h , parallel the account in the Haerye. (Perhaps the reason he created a new letter rather than adopting one from Phags-pa was that it was awkward to write these Chinese initials in Phags-pa, where ㅇ and ㆆ were both written as digraphs beginning with y, ꡭꡝ and ꡗꡖ.)

However, Ledyard's explanation of the letter ㆁ ng  differs from the Haerye account; he sees it as a fusion of velar ㄱ g and null ㅇ, reflecting its variable pronunciation. The Korean alphabet was designed not just to write Korean, but to accurately represent Chinese. The expected shape of a velar nasal, the short vertical stroke (⃓) that would be left by removing the top stroke of ㄱ g, had the additional problem that it would have looked almost identical to the vowel ㅣ i . Sejong's solution solved both problems: The vertical stroke left from ㄱ g was added to the null symbol ㅇ to create ㆁ ng, iconically capturing both regional pronunciations as well as being easily legible. Eventually the graphic distinction between the two silent initials ㅇ and ㆁ was lost, as they never contrasted in Korean words.

Another letter composed of two elements to represent two regional pronunciations, now obsolete, was ㅱ, which transcribed the Chinese initial 微. This represented either m or w in various Chinese dialects, and was composed of ㅁ  plus ㅇ. In Phags-pa, a loop under a letter, ꡧ, represented  after vowels, and Ledyard proposes this rather than the null symbol was the source of the loop at the bottom, so that the two components of ㅱ reflected its two pronunciations just as the two components of ㆁ ng did. The reason for suspecting that this derives from Phags-pa ꡧ w is that the entire labio-dental series of both Phags-pa and the hangul, used to transcribe the Chinese initials 微非敷 w, v, f, have such composite forms, though in the case of Phags-pa these are all based on the letter ꡜ h (ꡤ etc.), while in hangul, which does not have an h among its basic consonants, they are based on the labial series ㅁ m, ㅂ b, ㅍ p.

An additional letter, the 'semi-sibilant' ㅿ z, now obsolete, has no explanation in either Ledyard or the Haerye.

As a final piece of evidence, Ledyard notes that, with two exceptions, hangul letters have the simple geometric shapes expected of invention: ㄱ g  was the corner of a square, ㅁ m  a full square, ㅅ s  a chevron, ㅇ a circle. In the Hunmin Jeong-eum, before the influence of the writing brush made them asymmetrical, these were purely geometric. The exceptions were ㄷ d  and ㅂ b , which had more complex geometries and were two of the forms adopted from Phags-pa. For example, ㄷ d  wasn't a simple half square, but even in the Hunmin Jeong-eum had a lip protruding from the upper left corner, just as Phags-pa ꡊ d did, and as Tibetan ད d did before that.

If the Phags-pa theory is valid, then the graphic base of Hangul consonants is part of the great family of alphabets that spread from the Phoenician alphabet, through Aramaic, Brāhmī, and Tibetan (though the derivation of Brahmi from Aramaic/Phoenician is also tenuous; see the Semitic-model hypothesis for Brahmi). However, this is only one component of its derivation: Hangul did not derive from Phags-pa in the gradual and unconscious way that the Latin alphabet derived from the Greek. Ledyard wrote:

Iconic design of vowel letters

The seven basic vowel letters were not adopted from an existing script. They were straight lines, dots, and lines with dots that appear to have been designed by Sejong or his ministers to represent the phonological principles of Korean. At least two parameters were used in their design, vowel harmony and iotation.

The Korean language of this period had vowel harmony to a greater extent than it does today. Vowels alternated in pairs according to their environment. Vowel harmony affected the morphology of the language, and Korean phonology described it in terms of yin and yang: If a root had yang ("deep") vowels, then most suffixes also had to have yang vowels; conversely, if the root had yin ("shallow") vowels, the suffixes needed to be yin as well. The seven vowel sounds of Korean thus fell into two harmonic groups of three vowels each, with the seventh vowel, ㅣ i, falling outside this system. ㅣ i was harmonically neutral and could coexist with either yin or yang vowels, and for this reason was called "mediating". The letters for the yin vowels were ㅡ ɨ, ㅜ u, ㅓ ə; dots, if present, were placed in the yin directions of down and left. The yang vowel letters were ㆍ ʌ, ㅗ o, and ㅏ a, with the dots in the yang directions of up and right.

Of these seven vowel sounds, three could not be iotized (preceded by a y- sound). These three were written with a single stroke: ㅡ ɨ, ㆍ ʌ, ㅣ i. (The letter ㆍ ʌ is now obsolete except in Jeju dialect.) The Hunmin Jeong-eum states that the shapes of the strokes were chosen to represent the Confucian 三才 sāncái "three realms" of 天 heaven, a yang concept, represented with a dot for the sun, ; 地 earth, a yin concept, represented with a flat line, ; and 人 man, represented with an upright line, who mediates between the two. The other four vowels, which could be iotized, were written as a dot next to a line: yin ㅓ ə and yang ㅏ a (which alternate under vowel harmony), yin ㅜ u and yang ㅗ o (which also alternate). Iotation was then indicated by doubling this dot: ㅕ yə, ㅑ ya, ㅠ yu, ㅛ yo.

There was presumably a third parameter in designing the vowel letters, not mentioned in the Haerye, namely choosing horizontal ㅡ ɨ as the graphic base of "closed" (rounded) ㅜ u and ㅗ o, and vertical ㅣ i as the base of "open" (unrounded) ㅓ ə and ㅏ a. The horizontal letters ㅡㅜㅗ ɨ u o represented back vowels  in the fifteenth century, as they do today, whereas the fifteenth-century sound values of ㅣㅓㅏ i ə a are uncertain. In the latter case, the vertical letters would have represented front vowels, the dot the sole central vowel, and the vowel harmony, described as "shallow" vs "deep", would have been one of vowel height, with the yang vowels lower than their yin counterparts.

A resemblance of Phags-pa ꡠ e to hangul ㅡ ɨ (both horizontal lines), and of Phags-pa ꡡ o to hangul ㅗ o (both horizontal lines with an upper point in the middle), would back up Ledyard's theory if a connection were proven.

Diacritics for suprasegmentals
Korean has a simple tone system often characterized by the poorly defined term "pitch accent". Hangul originally had two diacritics to represent this system, a single tick, as in 성〮, for high tone, and a double tick, as in 성〯, for a long vowel. When transcribing Chinese, these had been used for the 'departing' (去聲) and 'rising' (上聲) tones, respectively.  (The 'even' tone (平聲) was not marked.  The 'entering' (入聲) "tone", which was not a tone at all, was indicated by its final stop consonant.)  Although the pitch and length distinctions are still made in speech by many Koreans, the diacritics are obsolete.

See also

Hangul
Phags-pa

Notes

References
 
 
 
 Andrew West, The Měnggǔ Zìyùn 蒙古字韻 "Mongolian Letters arranged by Rhyme"

Hangul
15th century in Korea